The Attached Senior School of Shandong Normal University (Chinese: 山东师范大学附属中学; Pinyin: Shāndōng Shīfàn Dàxué Fùshǔ Zhōngxué), or simply Shangshi Fuzhong is a high school in Jinan City, Shandong Province, China.

The school was founded in 1950 as Shandong Province Industry and Agricultural Intensive Senior School and in 1955 became the Attached Senior School of Shandong Normal College (which later became Shandong Normal University).

The School is a normalized key high schools in Shandong Province.

Notable alumni
 Wei Dongyi, a mathematician

Notes

External links
School website (in Chinese)

High schools in Shandong
Educational institutions established in 1950
1950 establishments in China
Jinan
Shandong Normal University